David Wilson (born 22 February 1974) is a Scottish football manager who was a head coach of Manchester 62 in the Gibraltar National League. From April 2013 to March 2015, he served as an assistant manager of the national team under head coach Allen Bula and held the position when the Gibraltar Football Association (GFA) was admitted to UEFA in May 2013.

Early life
Wilson was born in Redlands hospital on the west end of Glasgow, Scotland and his family moved to Pennyburn area of Kilwinning  in 1985.

Career

Playing career
During his short playing career, Wilson played for Pennyburn Boys Club, Ardeer Thistle, and Kilwinning Rangers, for which he was considered a "star" during the 1990s under head coach Jim McSherry.  He was also on the books of Kilmarnock from 1988 to 1992 as an S form Schoolboy before becoming one of the club's first ever apprentice professional footballers under manager Jim Fleeting in 1990. Wilson decided to walk away from playing at only 19 years of age because he thought that he would never make it at the top level. At this time, Wilson joined the Royal Navy.  During his time serving with the Royal Navy Wilson maintained a good level of football representing Worthing Town 1994–95, Bashley FC 1996–97, Newport isle of wight from 1998 to 2002, before returning to Bashley FC for his final year of football south of the border in 2002–03 playing in the Hampshire cup final against Aldershot Town FC. between 2003 and 2005 Wilson represented three Scottish non league clubs, Troon, Saltcoats Vic FC and finally Auchinleck Talbot before deciding to retire from playing. In 2019 he re-registered as a player, aged 44, amid an injury crisis at Bruno's Magpies, playing 65 minutes at centre-back in a 5-2 Gibraltar Division 2 Cup win over Leo.

Managerial career
In 2008, Wilson's Navy career took him to Gibraltar to serve as an Exercise Rehabilitation Officer. He also played in matches organized by the Royal Navy Football Association.  At this time, he also offered his services to local football clubs to help with fitness. After becoming acquainted with Allen Bula, head coach of the Gibraltar national football team, Wilson was asked to offer his services to the national team in April 2013. After initially thinking that he would only be assessing players and helping with rehabilitation, he soon discovered Bula wanted him to become his "right hand man" and was named an assistant.

Wilson was then on the bench as Gibraltar made their international debut in November 2013, a scoreless draw against Slovakia.  Wilson described it as a special occasion when Gibraltar was drawn into the same qualifying group as his native Scotland for UEFA Euro 2016 qualifying, Gibraltar's first appearance in an official UEFA tournament.

After Bula was dismissed as head coach of the Gibraltar national team on 2 March 2015, Wilson was named interim head coach beginning with the team's 29 March 2015 UEFA Euro 2016 qualifying fixture against his native Scotland at Hampden Park. Wilson currently holds his Uefa 'A' Coaching licence having completed both his Uefa A and B coaching badges in his native Scotland.

Achievements
With Bruno's Magpies
Gibraltar Second Division: 2018–19
Gibraltar Division 2 Cup: 2018–19
With Manchester 62
GFA Challenge Trophy: 2021–22

Managerial statistics

Includes accredited UEFA fixture(s) only:

References

External links
Profile at Soccerway

Gibraltar national football team managers
Scottish footballers
Scottish football managers
Scottish expatriate football managers
Kilmarnock F.C. players
Troon F.C. players
F.C. Bruno's Magpies players
Living people
1974 births
Association football defenders
People from Kilwinning
Scottish Junior Football Association players
Ardeer Thistle F.C. players
Bashley F.C. players
Newport (IOW) F.C. players
Auchinleck Talbot F.C. players
Expatriate football managers in Gibraltar
Gibraltar National League managers
Scottish expatriate sportspeople in Gibraltar